Simon James Green (born 19 March 1970) is a former English cricketer.  Green was a right-handed batsman who bowled left-arm medium pace.  He was born in Bloxwich, Staffordshire.

Green made his first-class debut for Warwickshire against Lancashire in 1988 County Championship.  He made just four further first-class appearances for the county, the last of which came against Somerset in the 1991 County Championship.  In his five first-class matches, he scored a total of 168 runs at an average of 24.00, with a highest score of 77 not out.  This score, which was his only first-class fifty, came against Somerset in 1991.  His List A debut came in the 1988 Refuge Assurance League against Kent.  Green made eight further List A appearances, the last of which came against Lancashire in the 1991 Refuge Assurance League.  In his nine List A matches, he scored a total of 44 runs at an average of 6.28, with a high score of 25.

References

External links
Simon Green at ESPNcricinfo
Simon Green at CricketArchive

1970 births
Living people
People from Bloxwich
English cricketers
Warwickshire cricketers
People educated at Old Swinford Hospital